The Order of the Flag of the People's Republic of Hungary was a State Order of the Hungarian People's Republic.

It was founded by Decree No. 17 of 1956 and then was abolished in 1991.

Classes
The Order originally had five Classes, the 4th and 5th being abolished in 1963.

Recipients 

 Anatoly Alexandrov (physicist)
 Leonid Brezhnev
 Vladimir Dzhanibekov
 Anatoly Filipchenko
 Yuri Gagarin
 Henryk Jabłoński
 Yevgeny Nesterenko
 Nikolai Ogarkov
 Vitaly Popkov
 Konstantin Provalov
 László Salgó
 Pyotr Shafranov
 Vladimir Sudets
 Yumjaagiin Tsedenbal
 Dmitry Ustinov
 Boris Volynov
 Boris Yegorov
 Alexei Yepishev

Insignia

The Star of the Order was an 8-pointed gold star with shorter points between, and with the national flag at the centre surrounded by laurels. The classes of the Order were distinguished by the materials used in the laurels - gold with diamonds for the first class; gold with rubies for the second; gold for the third; green enamel for the fourth.

Sources

Orders, Medals and Decorations of Britain and Europe in Colour, Paul Hieronymussen, Blandford Press, 1967

Flag of the Republic of Hungary, Order of the
Awards established in 1956